Haruru is a settlement in Garissa County, Kenya. It lies within Arawale National Reserve.

References 

Populated places in North Eastern Province (Kenya)
Garissa County